Vincenzo Valdrè, also known as Vincent Waldré (1740–1814), was an Italian artist and architect who was born in Faenza and brought up in Parma, but who practiced in a Neoclassical-style in England and Ireland.

Sometimes referred to as il Faenza or "Il Faentino", he studied in the Academy of Fine Arts in Parma under Giuseppe Baldrighi and in 1764 won an award at the Academy for his drawing of Agar in the Desert consoled by the Angel. In 1768 he went to complete his studies in the French Academy in Rome.

While in Rome he taught the architects James Lewis (1751–1820) and Richard Norris (1750–1794). In 1774 he exhibited a painting entitled "Jupiter and Thetis" at the Free Society of Artists in London, giving as his address 20 Frith Street, Soho. At around this time he was recruited by George Nugent-Temple-Grenville, 1st Marquess of Buckingham to work on Stowe House  in Buckinghamshire, England.He moved with his patron to Ireland, perhaps in 1787, when the latter became, for the second time, the Lord Lieutenant. He painted the ceilings in St Patrick's Hall in the Dublin Castle with frescoes depicting Irish history, including St Patrick lighting the Paschal fire on the Hill of Slane. He died in Dublin, reportedly in August 1814.

References

1740 births
1814 deaths
18th-century Italian painters
Italian male painters
19th-century Italian painters
Irish painters
Italian neoclassical painters
Painters from Parma
People from Faenza
19th-century Italian male artists
18th-century Italian male artists